Douglas Pipes is an American film score composer whose feature films include the Academy Award-nominated Monster House, the horror film Trick 'r Treat, and the Christmas comedy-horror film Krampus. His brassy instrumentations have drawn comparisons to action-music composer guru Alan Silvestri and his other orchestral-music composer counterparts Michael Giacchino, J.A.C. Redford and Joel McNeely. His chance encounter with Gil Kenan at UCLA California made him the perfect composer for this soundtrack and composed the music on his short film The Lark.

Awards include International Film Music Critics Association "Best Original Score for a Comedy Film 2015" for the Horror/Comedy Krampus, "Compositor Revalacion" for Monster House at the 3rd International Film Music Conference in Ubeda, Spain and "Best Animation” at the Royal Television Society in the United Kingdom.  Nominations include “Discovery of the Year" for Monster House at the 2006 World Soundtrack Awards in Ghent, Belgium, "Best Music" at the 2007 Saturn Awards, "Best Horror Score" 2009 for Trick 'r Treat 2009 and "Best New Composer" 2006 for Monster House from the International Film Music Critics Association.

Soundtrack CDs are available from LaLaLand Records and vinyl from Waxwork Records.

Pipes also works with the rock band The Airborne Toxic Event, providing arrangements and orchestrations for symphony concerts across the U.S.

Pipes has been commissioned twice by the Dallas Chamber Symphony a to compose original scores for their silent film series. In 2014 for Alfred Hitchcock's silent film, The Lodger: A Story of the London Fog. The premiere was October 8, 2014. Also in 2017 for the Buster Keaton film The General, with a premiere October 17, 2017.

Credits
 The Babysitter (2017) by McG
 The General (2017) (commissioned live concert score) by Buster Keaton
 Craggio by Zach Shields
 The Shadowman (2016)
 Krampus (2015) by Michael Dougherty
 If There Be Thorns (2015) (original score music) by VC Andrews, dir. Nancy Savoca
 Seeds of Yesterday (2015) (original score music) by VC Andrews, dir. Shawn Ku
 The Lodger (2014) (commissioned live concert score) by Alfred Hitchcock
 Little Paradise (2014) (original score music) by Natan Moss
 Waking (2013) (original score music) by Ben Shelton
 Barbie: Mariposa and the Fairy Princess (2013) (original score music)
 Bad Blood Days (2010) (original score music)
 City of Ember (2008) (additional music composer, writer and performer: Mayor's Fanfare) by Gil Kenan
 Trick 'r Treat (2007) (original score composer) by Michael Dougherty
 Monster House (2006) (original score composer) by Gil Kenan
 The Three Body Problem (2004) (composer)
 Walter (2003) (composer)
 The Lark (2002) (original music)
 Grandpa (1990) (composer)
 Bonneville, Arizona (1989) (composer)
 Moonstalker (1989) (original music) by Michael O'Rourke

References

External links
 

Living people
20th-century American composers
21st-century American composers
American film score composers
American male film score composers
20th-century American male musicians
21st-century American male musicians
Year of birth missing (living people)
Varèse Sarabande Records artists
La-La Land Records artists